St. Charles Country Club is a private country club in Winnipeg, Manitoba. It features three 9-hole golf courses, each with a distinct style that reflects the golf course designer responsible for it.

History 
The original 18-hole course was opened in 1904, but three legendary golf course designers are responsible for the current 27 holes. In 1919, Donald Ross rebuilt the course and created the two nines that now comprise the South and West nines.  Alister MacKenzie was then hired to create an additional nine holes and designed the North nine, which opened in 1931. In 1954, Canada's Norman Woods was responsible for the renovation and redesign of the West nine. The North, West and South Nines were renamed the MacKenzie, Woods, and Ross nines, respectively, in honour of the designer responsible for each nine following the club's centennial celebrations in 2004.

The course has played host to LPGA, Senior PGA and Shell's Wonderful World of Golf events. The club hosted the 1952 Canadian Open, a PGA Tour tournament, which was won by Johnny Palmer, and the 1992 du Maurier Classic, an LPGA major, which was won by Sherri Steinhauer.

In August 2010, the club hosted the LPGA's Canadian Women's Open, won by Michelle Wie; the MacKenzie (North) nine was used as the front nine, and the Ross (South) nine was used as the back nine.

Status 
Jeffry Hall Brock, the founder of the largest publicly traded company based in Winnipeg Great-West Lifeco, was one of the club's founding members. Since then, St. Charles has enjoyed a reputation of being the elite private club in the city of Winnipeg.

Longtime Head Chef Takashi "Tony" Murakami is widely known as one of the top chefs in the country and was captain and a member of the Canadian national culinary team for ten years, including Canada's world championship team in 1984, later serving as team coach.  He has been named a member of the Order of Canada.

See also
List of golf courses in Manitoba

References

External links 
 St. Charles Country Club

Golf clubs and courses in Manitoba
Golf clubs and courses designed by Alister MacKenzie
Golf clubs and courses designed by Donald Ross
Assiniboia, Winnipeg
Sports venues in Winnipeg